The men's 400 metres event at the 2013 Asian Athletics Championships was held at the Shree Shiv Chhatrapati Sports Complex. The final took place on 4 July.

Medalists

Results

Heats
First 3 in each heat (Q) and 4 best performers (q) advanced to the semifinals.

Semi-finals
First 3 in each heat (Q) and 2 best performers (q) advanced to the final.

Final

References
Results

400 Men's
400 metres at the Asian Athletics Championships